Quyen T. Nguyen is an American surgeon-scientist and Professor in the Department of Surgery at UC San Diego School of Medicine and Associate Director of Education and Training at UC San Diego Moores Cancer Center. She is known for her work pioneering fluorescence guided surgery and co-holds several patents with Nobel Laureate Roger Y. Tsien, PhD pertaining to their invention of peptides, imaging systems and methods to support fluorescence-guided cancer tumor resection and fluorescent labeling of nerves on the surgical bed.

Education 
Nguyen received a Bachelor's degree in Psychobiology from the University of Southern California, and an MD/PhD in Medicine and Neuroscience from Washington University School of Medicine in St. Louis, Missouri in the lab of Jeff W. Lichtman. While in Lichtman's lab, Nguyen developed an in-vivo fluorescence time-lapse imaging system to visualize motor nerve regeneration. She completed her General Surgery internship at Barnes-Jewish Hospital and a residency in Otolaryngology and Head and neck surgery at UC San Diego.

Career and awards 
Nguyen is board-certified in Head and Neck Surgery and Neurotology/Skull Base Surgery. She serves as Director of the Facial Nerve Clinic at UC San Diego, which provides evaluation and surgical treatment for patients with varying facial nerve dysfunctions. In her clinical practice she also treats and operates on patients with diseases of the ear and skull base. She is Professor of Surgery in the UC San Diego School of Medicine, and serves as Associate Director of Education and Training at UC San Diego Moores Cancer Center where her focus is on providing equitable access to quality cancer education and training programs across all academic and faculty levels.

Nguyen and her research team have received a number of grants and awards including support from the NIH and a Burroughs Wellcome Award in 2009 which have helped to support her research into fluorescence guided surgery, hailed as a breakthrough in numerous news and scientific publications.

In 2011, Nguyen presented a talk at a TEDMED conference titled, "Color-Coded Surgery" that has been viewed over 1.2 million times on Ted.com. In 2014, Nguyen received the Presidential Early Career Award for Scientists and Engineers (PECASE) from President Barack Obama for her pioneering work in fluorescence guided surgery. In 2017, Nguyen founded Alume Biosciences, a biotechnology startup with the goal of translating nerve agents developed in the lab to aid physicians in visualizing nerves in the operating room.

References 

American surgeons
21st-century American women scientists
Living people
American technology chief executives
Year of birth missing (living people)
Women biotechnologists
21st-century American scientists
21st-century American physicians
21st-century American women physicians
Women medical researchers
American medical researchers
University of Southern California alumni
Washington University School of Medicine alumni
University of California, San Diego faculty
Women surgeons